Cherkutino is a rural locality (a selo) and the administrative center of Cherkutinskoye Rural Settlement, Sobinsky District, Vladimir Oblast, Russia. The population was 1,002 as of 2010. There are 12 streets.

Geography 
Cherkutino is located 36 km northwest of Sobinka (the district's administrative centre) by road. Goryamino is the nearest rural locality.

References 

Rural localities in Sobinsky District
Vladimirsky Uyezd